The Soissons Memorial is a World War I memorial located in the town of Soissons, in the Aisne département of France. The memorial lists 3,887 names of British soldiers with no known grave who were killed in the area from May to August 1918 during the German spring offensive. The battles fought by those commemorated here include the Third Battle of the Aisne and the Second Battle of the Marne.

This is a free-standing memorial (one without an associated cemetery) constructed in Portland stone. It was designed by G. H. Holt and V. O. Rees with sculpture by Eric Kennington. The memorial was unveiled on 22 July 1928 by Sir Alexander Hamilton-Gordon. Hamilton-Gordon was a general in World War I, commanding IX Corps from 1916 onwards, and was commander of this corps during the Third Battle of the Aisne, which is commemorated here.

See also
 List of Commonwealth War Graves Commission World War I memorials to the missing in Belgium and France

References

External links
Details of Kennington's sculpture and the inscription (from YourArchives)

Commonwealth War Graves Commission memorials
World War I memorials in France
Buildings and structures completed in 1928
Buildings and structures in Aisne
Tourist attractions in Aisne